Bure Equity is a Swedish investment company involved in communications, textiles, training, and education. It is the largest private school operator in Sweden. This role gained it international attention in connection to the rise of independent schools in Sweden. Bure Equity owns Vittra, a company that runs schools in Sweden and other countries.

On the 11 February 2009 Altor Fund III and Bure Equity AB signed an agreement to acquire Carnegie Investment Bank, a leading independent Nordic investment bank, from the Swedish National Debt Office. The total net asset value on 31 December 2016 amounted to six billion kroner and the largest holdings were in the companies Mycronic and Vitrolife. The company also has shares in, among others, the industrial company Cavotec, the pharmaceutical company MedCap, the medical technology company Xvivo Perfusion and the auction company Lauritz.com.

Henrik Blomquist took over as CEO in 2014.

References

External links 
Official site

Companies based in Stockholm
Investment companies of Sweden
1992 establishments in Sweden
Financial services companies established in 1992
Companies listed on Nasdaq Stockholm
Education companies of Europe
Education in Sweden